The A8 motorway (abbreviated AOW) or Wrocław Motorway Bypass or Autostrada A8 is a  motorway bypass of the city of Wrocław, Poland.

Outside of Wrocław, A8 continues in an expressway standard as Expressway S8.

The motorway opened to traffic on 31 August 2011. It is not planned to be subject to tolling.

Route description

Route history
Initial plans had the A8 motorway ran the entire route between Wrocław and Łódź, with a southern portion of the road continuing towards the Czech Republic to provide access to Prague. In 2000, the motorway was truncated to its current length bypassing the western and northern portions of Wroclaw, while the rest of the route was decided to be completed in an expressway standard as Expressway S8. During the campaign for the 2007 parliamentary elections, the Civic Platform party pledged to upgrade the connection to motorway standard, thus extending the A8 motorway. However, after forming a government following its victory, the party abandoned the idea, explaining that the required changes in planning would unacceptably delay the construction by many years.

On 1 September 2011, the Ministry of Infrastructure published draft regulation on the motorway's tolling. According to the ministry, the A8 motorway will not be subject to tolling for motorists, however the entire route of the motorway is subject to electronic toll collection system mandatory for vehicles heavier then 3.5 tons, known as e-TOLL.

Images

See also
European route E67

References

External links

  Official page of the project
 Route map on the official project page (low resolution)
 Map of the motorway (high resolution, pdf format)

Motorways in Poland
Proposed roads in Poland